The Russian Olympic Committee (ROC; ; Full name: All-Russian united social union "Olympic Committee of Russia") is the National Olympic Committee representing Russia.

History
Russia's Olympic Committee was founded in 1911 by representatives of Russian Sports Societies at a meeting in Saint Petersburg, in the premises of the Imperial Russian Society for Saving on the Water (Sadovaya Street 50), when the Statute was adopted and members of the committee were elected.

The first chairman of the Russian Olympic Committee was Vyacheslav Sreznevsky.

In 1951–1992, the Russian Olympic Committee was essentially the Soviet Olympic Committee, based in Moscow.

By decision of the Constituent Assembly on 1 December 1989, the All-Russian Olympic Committee was established as an independent public organization within the Soviet Olympic Committee. On 13 August 1992, it was officially named the Russian Olympic Committee (ROC). Full and final recognition of the ROC as the legal successor of the Soviet Olympic Committee by the International Olympic Committee (IOC) was received at the 101st Session of the IOC in September 1992.

2017 to present

On 5 December 2017, the Russian Olympic Committee was suspended by the IOC over its participation in a state-sponsored doping program.

On 28 February 2018, following completion of doping test checks for Russian athletes who participated in the 2018 Winter Olympics, the IOC reinstated the Russian Olympic Committee, despite two failed drug tests.

On 9 December 2019, the World Anti-Doping Agency (WADA) banned Russia from all international sport for four years after it found that data provided by the Russian Anti-Doping Agency had been manipulated by Russian authorities with a goal of protecting athletes involved in its state-sponsored doping scheme. Russia filed an appeal to the Court of Arbitration for Sport (CAS) against the WADA decision. The Court of Arbitration for Sport, on review of Russia's appeal of its case from WADA, ruled on 17 December 2020 to reduce the penalty that WADA had placed. Instead of banning Russia from sporting events, the ruling allowed Russia to participate at the Olympics and other international events, but for a period of two years, the team was not allowed to use the Russian name, flag, or anthem and must present themselves as "Neutral Athlete" or "Neutral Team". The ruling did allow for team uniforms to display "Russia" on the uniform, as well as the use of the Russian flag colors within the uniform's design, although the name should be up to equal predominance as the "Neutral Athlete/Team" designation.

On 19 February 2021, it was announced that Russia would compete under the acronym "ROC", after the name of the Russian Olympic Committee. On aftermatch, the IOC announced that the Russian national flag would be substituted by the flag of the Russian Olympic Committee. It would also be allowed to use team uniforms featuring the logo of the Russian Olympic Committee, or the acronym "ROC" would be added.

On 15 April 2021, the uniforms for the Russian Olympic Committee athletes were unveiled, featuring the colours of the Russian flag. On 22 April 2021, the replacement for Russia's anthem was approved by the IOC, after an earlier choice of the patriotic Russian war song "Katyusha" was rejected.  A fragment of Pyotr Tchaikovsky's Piano Concerto No. 1 is used.

Presidents

IOC members

Member federations
Russian National Federations are the organizations that coordinate all aspects of their individual sports. They are responsible for training, competition, and development of their sports. There are 37 Summer Olympic and 12 Winter Olympic sport federations in Russia, all headquartered in Moscow.

See also
 Doping in Russia
 Russia at the Olympics
Russian Olympic Committee athletes at the 2020 Summer Olympics
Russian Olympic Committee athletes at the 2022 Winter Olympics
 Russian Paralympic Committee
 Russian Paralympic Committee athletes at the 2020 Summer Paralympics
 Russian Paralympic Committee athletes at the 2022 Winter Paralympics
 Sochi 2014 Olympic and Paralympic Organizing Committee
 Russian Ministry of Sport
 Soviet Olympic Committee

Sources

External links
 
 

Russia
Russia at the Olympics
Oly
1989 establishments in Russia
Articles containing video clips